José de Jesús Navarro Moreno, (January 20, 1913 – December 23, 1993), better known by his stage name of "Chucho" Navarro, was a Mexican singer and founding member of the Trio Los Panchos. 

Chucho Navarro was born in Irapuato, Guanajuato on January 20, 1913. He was the second voice in the trio, singing harmony and playing a guitar. He continued to sing in this role until his death on December 23, 1993, at the age of 80.

See also
Los Panchos
Alfredo Gil

External links
Biography Page of Chucho Navarro at the Los Panchos Official Website. In Spanish

1913 births
1993 deaths
20th-century Mexican male singers
People from Irapuato
Singers from Guanajuato